Little Neshannock Creek is a  long tributary to Neshannock Creek in Lawrence County that rises in Mercer County.  This creek drains several glacial wetlands and the Borough of New Wilmington, Pennsylvania.

References

Rivers of Lawrence County, Pennsylvania
Rivers of Mercer County, Pennsylvania
Rivers of Pennsylvania
Tributaries of the Beaver River